The 2017 Asian Junior and Cadet Table Tennis Championships were held in Asan, Republic of Korea, from  29 June to 4 July 2017. It was organised by the Korea Table Tennis Association under the authority of the Asian Table Tennis Union (ATTU).

Medal summary

Events

Medal table

See also

2017 World Junior Table Tennis Championships
Asian Table Tennis Championships
Asian Table Tennis Union

References

Asian Junior and Cadet Table Tennis Championships
Asian Junior and Cadet Table Tennis Championships
Asian Junior and Cadet Table Tennis Championships
Asian Junior and Cadet Table Tennis Championships
Table tennis competitions in South Korea
International sports competitions hosted by South Korea
Asian Junior and Cadet Table Tennis Championships
Asian Junior and Cadet Table Tennis Championships